Latchman is a family and given name.

Given name 

 Latchman Bhansingh (born 1966), former Canadian international cricketer

Surname 

 David Latchman, (born 1956), British geneticist and university administrator
 Harry Latchman (born 1943), former English cricketer
 Joan Latchman, seismologist from Trinidad and Tobago